Events in the year 2010 in Bulgaria.

Incumbents 
 President: Georgi Parvanov
 Prime Minister: Boyko Borisov
 Speaker: Tsetska Tsacheva

Events 

 15 December – A government-appointed commission finds that 45 senior Bulgarian diplomats were secret service agents during the communist era. Boyko Borisov calls on the government to sack the diplomats.

References 

2010s in Bulgaria

2010 in Bulgaria
Years of the 21st century in Bulgaria
Bulgaria
Bulgaria